The Soap Lake Fire was a wildfire four miles north of Soap Lake in Grant County, Washington in the United States. The fire started on June 11, 2018. The fire was contained on June 14. The fire threatened numerous homes and outbuildings and an estimated 50 residents.

Events

The Soap Lake Fire started on June 11, 2018 at 4:30 p.m. along State Route 17, four miles north of Soap Lake in Washington. The fire grew rapidly due to strong winds. Many homes and outbuildings were saved while evacuation warnings were put in place for approximately 50 area residents.  

After midnight on June 12, the fire had reportedly burned  of grass, sage and brush and was 50 percent contained. One small outbuilding was destroyed by the fire.

The fire was 100 percent contained by noon on June 14, 2018. The cause of the fire remains unreported by the Bureau of Land Management, who oversaw the fire.

References

2018 Washington (state) wildfires
Grant County, Washington
June 2018 events in the United States